Neal A. Melick was an engineer who worked for the United States federal government. Melick was the supervising engineer for many federal construction projects.  He is credited with a number of buildings now listed on the U.S. National Register of Historic Places, often in conjunction with Louis A. Simon serving as supervising architect.

During the World War II war-time rearrangements of public efforts under the Federal Works Agency (FWA), Melick was the superintendent of construction of U.S. public buildings.

His works include:
United States Bullion Depository, Fort Knox (with Louis A. Simon as Supervising Architect)
 United States Post Office–Bronx Central Annex (Thomas H. Ellett, architect designer; Louis A. Simon, supervising architect)
Chilton Post Office, 57 E. Main St. Chilton, Wisconsin (with Louis A. Simon), Colonial Revival architecture, NRHP-listed
United States Post Office–Adel, Georgia, 115 E. 4th St. Adel, Georgia (with Louis A. Simon), Colonial Revival, NRHP-listed
Berlin Post Office, 122 S. Pearl St. Berlin, Wisconsin (Simon, Louis A. and Melick, Neal A.), NRHP-listed
Columbus Post Office, 211 S. Dickason Blvd. Columbus, Wisconsin (Simon, Louis A. and Melick), Neal A., NRHP-listed
Edgerton Post Office, 104 N. Swift St. Edgerton, Wisconsin (Simon, Louis A. and Melick, Neal A.), NRHP-listed
Elkhorn Post Office, 102 E. Walworth St. Elkhorn, Wisconsin (Simon, Louis A. and Melick, Neal A.), NRHP-listed
Fort Smith US Post Office and Courthouse, now aka Judge Isaac C. Parker Federal Building, 30 S. Sixth St. Fort Smith, Arkansas (Melick, Neal A.), Louis A. Simon, et al.) built 1937, NRHP-listed
Kewaunee Post Office, 119 Ellis St. Kewaunee, Wisconsin Melick, Neal A., NRHP-listed
Lancaster Post Office, 236 W. Maple St. Lancaster, Wisconsin Simon, Louis A. and Melick, Neal A., NRHP-listed
Medford Post Office, 304 S. Main St. Medford, Wisconsin Melick, Neal A., NRHP-listed
Naco Border Station, 106 D St. Naco, Arizona Melick, Neal A., NRHP-listed
Neillsville Post Office, 619 Hewett St. Neillsville, Wisconsin Simon, Louis A. and Melick, Neal A., NRHP-listed
Prairie du Chien Post Office, 120 S. Beaumont Rd. Prairie du Chien, Wisconsin Simon, Louis A. and Melick Neal A., NRHP-listed
Reedsburg Post Office, 215 N. Walnut St. Reedsburg, Wisconsin Simon, Louis and Melick, Neal A., NRHP-listed
Shawano Post Office, 235 S. Main St. Shawano, Wisconsin Simon, Louis A. and Melick Neal A., NRHP-listed
St. Albans Post Office, 202 Sixth Ave. St. Albans, West Virginia Melick, Neil A., NRHP-listed
United States Post Office (Metuchen, New Jersey), 360 Main St. Metuchen Borough, New Jersey Melick, Neal A., NRHP-listed
United States Post Office-Decatur, Georgia, 141 Trinity Place Decatur, Georgia Melick, Neal A., NRHP-listed
US Post Office, 17 E. Jackson Ave. Ripley, Tennessee Melick, Neal A., NRHP-listed
US Post Office, 81 N. Forest St. Camden, Tennessee (Melick, Neal), NRHP-listed
US Post Office (Philadelphia), Old, 523 Main St. Philadelphia, Mississippi Melick, Neal A., NRHP-listed
US Post Office-Main, Morford St. and Court Sq. McMinnville, Tennessee Melick, Neal, NRHP-listed
Walnut Ridge Post Office, Old, 225 W. Main St. Walnut Ridge, Arkansas Melick, Neal A., NRHP-listed
Waupaca Post Office, 306 S. Main St. Waupaca, Wisconsin Simon, Louis A. and Melick, Neal A., NRHP-listed
West Allis Post Office, 7440 W. Greenfield Ave. West Allis, Wisconsin Melick, Neal A., NRHP-listed
West Bend Post Office, 607 Elm St. West Bend, Wisconsin simon, Louis A. and Melick, Neal A., NRHP-listed
Whitewater Post Office, 213 Center St. Whitewater, Wisconsin Melick, Neal A., NRHP-listed

References

Year of birth unknown
Year of death unknown
American engineers